ISHM may refer to:

International Society for the History of Medicine
Integrated System Health Management